"Cleopatra, Queen of Denial" is a song co-written and recorded by American country music artist Pam Tillis.  It was released in May 1993 as the third single from her album Homeward Looking Angel. The song reached number 11 on the Billboard Hot Country Singles & Tracks chart in July 1993.  The song was written by Tillis, Bob DiPiero, and Jan Buckingham.

Content
The song is centered on Egyptian mythology, in which the narrator compares herself to Queen Cleopatra since she's "queen of denial" by her significant other (a play on words of The Nile River).  A guitar solo in the chorus takes the melody of the traditional song The Streets of Cairo, or the Poor Little Country Maid, a song traditionally associated with Egyptian culture.

Music video
The music video was directed by Michael Salomon, and premiered in mid-1993. It was nominated for Music Video of the Year at the 1993 Country Music Association Awards.

Personnel
 Larry Byrom – electric guitar
 Joe Chemay – bass guitar
 Sonny Garrish – pedal and lap steel guitars
 John Hobbs – piano
 Paul Leim – drums
 Pam Tillis – lead and backing vocals
 Biff Watson – acoustic guitar
 Paul Worley – acoustic and electric guitars

Chart performance

References

1993 singles
Pam Tillis songs
Songs written by Pam Tillis
Songs written by Bob DiPiero
Song recordings produced by Paul Worley
Arista Nashville singles
Music videos directed by Michael Salomon
1992 songs